The Dacian fortress of Dalboșeț is a former Dacian fortified town in modern day Dalboșeț, Romania.

References

Dacian fortresses in Caraș-Severin County
Historic monuments in Caraș-Severin County